The 2005 Paris-Bruxelles was the 85th edition of the Paris–Brussels cycling race and was held on 10 September 2005. The race started in Soissons and finished in Anderlecht. The race was won by Robbie McEwen of the Davitamon-Lotto team.

Results
Source:

References

External links

Paris-Brussels
Paris-Brussels
Paris-Brussels
Paris-Brussels
Brussels Cycling Classic